Floyd Iglehart  (January 25, 1934 – September 5, 1987) was an American football halfback. He played for the Los Angeles Rams in 1958.

He shot and killed himself on September 5, 1987, in Dallas, Texas at age 53.

References

1934 births
1987 deaths
American football halfbacks
Los Angeles Rams players
Suicides by firearm in Texas